Michael Stuhlbarg is American character actor of stage and screen. 

He received a Golden Globe nomination and numerous critics awards for his leading performance in the Coen Brothers' A Serious Man (2009). He has received a Primetime Emmy nomination for Outstanding Supporting Actor – Limited Series for Hulu series The Looming Tower (2018), and Dopesick (2021). He has also received five Screen Actors Guild Award nominations winning twice for Outstanding Ensemble in a Drama Series for the HBO series Boardwalk Empire. 

He also received a Tony Award nomination for Best Featured Actor in a Play for his performance in Martin McDonagh's The Pillowman in 2006. He received a Drama Desk Award for the latter performance. For the play The Voysey Inheritance he received the Obie Award, and the Joe A. Callaway Award as well as a Drama Desk Award nomination.

Major associations

Emmy Awards

Golden Globe Awards

Screen Actors Guild Awards

Tony Awards

Theatre awards

Drama Desk Award

Lucille Lortel Award

Obie Award

Joe A. Callaway Award

Critics awards 
Film awards

References 

Stuhlbarg, Michael